The W810 (also available as the W810i and W810c) is a camera phone produced by Sony Ericsson. It was released in January 2006. It is the successor of the W800.

Features 
The W810 is part of Sony Ericsson's Walkman line of mobile phones. While being similar to the W800, the W810 benefited from several improvements. Most notably are quad band connectivity, EDGE support for faster wireless data transfers, a light level sensor, a slightly enhanced display, but slightly reduced battery life.

Other features include a full function internet browser, two megapixel digital camera with auto-focus and flash, the HPM-70 stereo headset, Memory Stick PRO Duo slot, 20 MB of internal memory, and a music-only mode where phone functions are fully turned off, which also allows the phone to be used as a Walkman in areas mobile phones would usually be barred from, such as airplanes and hospitals, in addition to providing longer battery-life. The phone supported MP3, AMR, MIDI, IMY, EMY, WAV (16 kHZ maximum sample rate) and AAC audio formats and MPEG-4 and 3GPP video formats. However WMA audio format is not supported.

While official support for Memory Stick PRO Duo is capped at 4 GB, users have reported using 16 GB sticks with full functionality (read and write), though at larger sizes, some functions (boot time, media playback, and file retrieval, for example) are noticeably slower.

Cosmetics 
There were many small cosmetic changes from the W800, but most noticeable is the absence of the classic joystick that has been found on the majority of Sony Ericsson mobile phones since the T68i. This has been replaced by a D-pad designed to improve ease of use when listening to music and to provide a longer life to the keypad (as the classic joystick tended to fail due to dust, especially on some models like the K700). The casing color has changed from burnt orange and cream to "Satin Black" or "Fusion White". The sliding camera lens cover has also been omitted completely. However, a K750i or W800 back cover (with lens cover) will fit with minor modifications.

Availability 
The Sony Ericsson W810 is available as the W810i for Europe, the Middle East, Africa, Asia-Pacific, and North America, and the W810c for mainland China. The W810 was released worldwide in January 2006. A white color variation officially called "Fusion White" was released on 20 June 2006.

Specification 

Screen
 176×220 pixels
 262,144 colour TFT-LCD

Memory
 512 MB Sony Memory Stick PRO Duo included 
 Phone memory 20 MB (Actual free memory may vary due to phone pre-configuration)
 Memory Stick PRO Duo support (up to 4 GB officially)

Networks
 GSM 850
 GSM 900
 GSM 1800
 GSM 1900
 EDGE

Available colors
 Satin Black
 Fusion White (limited market availability)

Sizes
 100 × 46 × 19 mm
 3.9 × 1.8 × 0.7 inches

Weight
 99 g
 3.5 oz

Camera
 2 Megapixels
 AF 4.8 mm 1:2.8

External links
 

W810
Mobile phones introduced in 2006
Mobile phones with infrared transmitter